Selçuk Hatun ("eloquent";  140725 October 1485) was an Ottoman princess, the daughter of Ottoman Sultan Mehmed I and his Kumru Hatun. She was the half-sister of Murad II.

Early life
Selçuk Hatun was born in 1407 in Merzifon. Her father was Mehmed I and her mother was Kumru Hatun. Due to Ottoman Interregnum, her father resided in the different places, after defeating his brothers in 1413, he finally succeeded the throne and Selçuk Hatun moved to Edirne in the Edirne Palace and spent her childhood years there. After her father's death in 1421, her older half-brother Murad II succeeded to the throne and she moved to Bursa.

Marriages
In 1425, her brother arranged her marriage to Damat Taceddin Ibrahim II Bey, he was the son of Candaroğlu İsfendiyar Bey, the ruler of Kastamonu and Sinop. Selçuk was eighteen years old at the time of her marriage, following her wedding she moved to Kastamonu. In the same year, she gave birth to her first child, a son Orhan Bey, he died in 1430. Their second child Paşa Melek Hatun was born in 1426, and died in 1436. Both of them were buried in mausoleum built by their mother. Their second daughter was Hafsa Hatun, who died at the age of sixteen in 1442. The couple's only child to reach adulthood, was their third daughter Hatice Hanzade Hatun.

After the death of her father-in-law, her husband Ibrahim Bey, became the ruler of Kastamonu. After his death, she moved back to Bursa in 1443. According to Mustafa Çağatay, Selçuk married Mahmud Bey and had a daughter named Hundi Hatun with him. However Necdet Sakaoğlu states that she instead married Beylerbeyi Karaca Pasha, who was martyred a year later after their marriage.

Role in accession of Sultan Cem
In 1481, after the death of her nephew Mehmed the Conqueror, a fight for the throne began between the two sons of Mehmed. Şehzade Bayezid and Cem Sultan rebelled against each other for the throne. She sided with Cem Sultan, when he unofficially declared himself as the sultan at her palace in Bursa on 31 May 1481. She saw Cem as a passionate, valiant and knowledgeable candidate for the throne. At her palace in Bursa, she had tried to gather many persons in order to stand against Bayezid.

When Bayezid started to march towards Bursa Sultan Cem had sent her to Bayezid as an ambassador after consulting the scholars in Bursa.  The proposal was simple however this would destroy the unity of the country and divide it in two, she returned without getting results. On 22 June 1481, Bayezid managed to throw Cem off the throne and succeeded to the throne and he was exiled to Naples, where he died. Selçuk Hatun returned to Bursa, where she spent the remaining years.

Charities

Selçuk Hatun built a mosque in her name near the Irgandı Bridge in 1450 in Bursa.  She also constructed an imaret, which provided fresh and free food to the poor. In Edirne, she constructed another mosque in her name. She contributed exclusively in the development of Edirne.

Selçuk Hatun had also built an imaret where fresh food was served to the poor. She constructed a bridge on the Nilüfer Creek on the road route from Bursa to Karacabey. She also commissioned a tomb in Kastamonu, where her children had been buried after their deaths.

Selçuk Hatun constructed another mosque in her name in Istanbul, and was constructed during the reign of her nephew, Mehmed. The mosque was burnt down due to fire, and was later reconstructed by Abbas Ağa, in the sixteenth century. In 1956, it was again demolished as a result of widening of the area, but later rebuilt by Ali Saim Ülgen in 1964.

Death
Selçuk Hatun died on 25 October 1485 and was buried in the mausoleum of her father Mehmed I Mausoleum, in Green Tomb, Bursa, Turkey.

Issue
By her first husband, Selçuk Hatun had three sons and three daughters:
 Orhan Bey ( 1424 - November 1429)
 Paşa Melek Hatun ( 1425 - 1436) 
 Emir Yusuf Bey ( 1426 - September 1441)
 Hafsa Hatun ( 1427 - May 1442)
 Hatice Hanzade Hatun (? - 1502). 
 Ishak Bali Bey (? - ?). Died in infancy. 

By her second husband, she had a daughter: 
 Hundi Hatun ( 1445 - ?). Probraly died in infancy.

Ancestry

References

Sources
 
 

1407 births
1485 deaths
People from Bursa
15th-century Ottoman princesses